Rob van Empel (born 17 July 1941) is a retired Dutch breaststroke swimmer. His career was overshadowed by Wieger Mensonides, who dominated the Dutch breaststroke through the 1960s. However, at the national championships in 1962, they both finished in a national record time. Thus van Empel qualified for the 1962 European Aquatics Championships where he won a bronze medal.

References

External link

1941 births
Living people
Dutch male breaststroke swimmers
People from Groesbeek
European Aquatics Championships medalists in swimming
Sportspeople from Gelderland